The  are Japanese professional wrestling, or puroresu, awards that have been handed out annually since 2007 by the program Indie no Oshigoto, broadcast on the Fighting TV Samurai TV channel. Unlike the more widely publicized and recognized Tokyo Sports Puroresu Awards that are awarded to all Japanese promotions, the Japan Indie Awards focus on the independent circuit and the smaller promotions.

The awards are voted by fans who can vote online on the Samurai TV website. The winners are announced before the start of the New Year's Pro-Wrestling event in Korakuen Hall.

There are currently five active awards given out by Samurai TV.

Active awards

MVP Award









Inactive awards







See also
 Tokyo Sports Puroresu Awards
 List of professional wrestling awards

References
General

Specific

Awards established in 2007
Professional wrestling awards
Professional wrestling-related lists
Puroresu